Partners Three is a 1919 American silent Western film directed by Fred Niblo. Nitrate and/or acetate copy exist at the Library of Congress. Prints held at the Library of Congress and UCLA Film and Television Archive.

Cast
 Enid Bennett as Agnes Cuyler
 Casson Ferguson as Arthur Gould
 J. P. Lockney as Hassayampa Hardy (as John P. Lockney)
 Robert McKim as Grant Haywood
 Lydia Yeamans Titus as Gossip

References

External links
 
 Partners Three; allmovie.com/synopsis(blank page, for future article)

1919 films
1919 Western (genre) films
American black-and-white films
Films directed by Fred Niblo
Silent American Western (genre) films
1910s American films